Sarab-e Bardin (also Romanized as Sarāb-e Bardīn and Sarābardīn) is a village in Robat Rural District, in the Central District of Khorramabad County, Lorestan Province, Iran. At the 2006 census, its population was 140, in 25 families.

References 

Towns and villages in Khorramabad County